Lamon is a comune in the Province of Belluno in the Italian region Veneto.

Lamon may also refer to:
Lamon (Crete), a town of ancient Crete, Greece
Lamon (name)
Lamon Records, an American record label
Lamon, the Filipino word for binge eating disorder.

See also
 Lamon Bay
Lemon (disambiguation)